This List of Bays of Outer Hebrides summarises the bays that are located on the islands of the Outer Hebrides in Scotland.

Lewis and Harris

Lewis

Lewis (Loch Seaforth)

Seaforth Island
Seaforth Island located in Loch Seaforth has no bays.

Lewis (Loch Sealg)

Eilean Liubhaird

Lewis (Park)

Eilean Mhealasta

Lewis (Loch Erisort)

Eilean Chaluim Chille
The inshore island of Eilean Chaluim Chille in the Loch Erisort sea loch, has no bays.

Lewis (Loch Ròg)

Ceabhaigh
The small island of Ceabhaigh, located in the outer part of the Loch Ròg sea loch, has no bays.

Eilean Chearstaidh
The small island of Eilean Chearstaidh, located in inner part of the Loch Ròg sea loch, has no bays.

Flodaigh
The small off-shore island of Flodaigh has no bays.

Fuaigh Beag
The small island of Fuaigh Beag has no bays.

Fuaigh Mòr
The small island of Fuaigh Mòr has no bays.

Great Bernera

Little Bernera
The small island of Little Bernera has no bays.

Pabaigh Mòr
The uninhabited island of Pabaigh Mòr has no bays.

Vacsay

Harris

Pabbay

Scalpay

Scarp
The island of Scarp, west of Hushinish on Harris has no bays.

Soay Mor
The tiny island of Soay Mòr in West Loch Tarbert has no bays.

Stockinish Island
The uninhabited Stockinish Island off the coast of Harris has no bays.

Taransay

Harris (East Loch Tarbert)

Eilean Chearstaidh
The small uninhabited island of Eilean Chearstaidh in Loch Roag has no bays.

Flodday
There are two "Flodday"s near Barra. One is in the Barra Isles at grid reference NL612924, the other in the Sound of Barra to the north at grid reference NF751022. The island of Flodday in the Barra Isles group at  has no bays. The island of Flodday in the Sound of Barra at  has no bays.

Loch Maddy

Ceallasaigh Beag
The small low-lying island of Ceallasaigh Beag had no bays.

Ceallasaigh Mòr
The small low-lying island of Ceallasaigh Mòr had no bays

Monach Islands

Ceann Ear

Ceann Iar

Shiant Islands

Eilean Mhuire

Garbh Eilean
The small island Garbh Eilean in the Shiant Islands group have no bays.

Barra Isles

Barra

Berneray

Flodday
The small island of Flodday, located to the south of Vatersay has no bays.

Lingeigh
The small island of Lingeigh has no bays.

Mingulay

Muldoanich
The small uninhabited island of Muldoanich (Gaelic: Maol Dòmhnaich) has no bays.

Pabbay

Sandray

Vatersay

Uists and Benbecula

Baleshare

Benbecula

Eriskay

Flodaigh
The tidal island of Flodaigh, lying to the north of Benbecula has no bays.

Fraoch-Eilean
The tidal island of Fraoch-Eilean has no bays.

Grimsay North

Grimsay South
The tidal island of Grimsay (South) has no bays.

North Uist

Boreray

Flodaigh Mòr
The island of Flodaigh Mòr of the shore at the northeastern end of Ronay has no bays.

Kirkibost
The tidal island of Kirkibost, located within the coast in the south-west corner of North Uist, has no bays.

Oronsay
The tidal islands of Oronsay, located in the north coast North Uist has no bays.

Ronay

Shillay
The small island of Shillay has no bays.

Vallay

South Uist

Calbhaigh
The small islands of Calbhaigh, that contains the remains of Calvay Castle has no bays.

Eileanan Iasgaich

Stuley
The small offshore island of Stuley (Gaelic:Stulaigh) has no bays

See also
 List of bays of Scotland
 List of bays of the Inner Hebrides
 List of bays of the Orkney Islands
 List of bays of the Shetland Islands

References

Bays
Scotland